This is a list of Canadian whistleblowers.

 Peter Bryce
 Shiv Chopra
 Allan Cutler
 Virgil Grandfield
 Alasdair Roberts
 Diane Urquhart
 J Robert Verdun
 Christopher Wylie

References

 
Whistleblowers
Whistleblowers